Endophilin-B1 is a protein that in humans is encoded by the SH3GLB1 gene. Endophilin-B1 belongs to the Bin/Amphiphysin/Rvs167 (BAR) family of proteins and plays a critical role in mitochondrial fission and fusion, as well as in autophagy and apoptosis. Loss of functional endophilin-B1 is seen in many different forms of cancer. The link between carcinogenesis and dysregulation of cell death pathways suggests that endophilin-B1 serves a critical tumor suppressor role in the cell, although the underlying mechanisms are not known.

Structure 

In the presence of model biological membranes, endophilin-B1 dimers assemble into helical scaffolds around the membrane and drive its tubulation.

Interactions 

In addition to the membrane binding and remodeling properties endophilin-B1 shares with many other BAR proteins, endophilin-B1 interacts with the pro-apoptotic factor Bcl-2-associated X protein (Bax) and SH3GLB2. It has also been shown to interact with a wide variety of proteins through a canonical SH3 domain that enables PxxP motif-containing protein interactions, including Beclin-1, amphiphysin-1, amphiphysin-2, and huntingtin.

References

Further reading